Twickenham is a suburban district in London, England. Historically part of Middlesex, it has formed part of the London Borough of Richmond upon Thames since 1965, and the borough council's administrative headquarters are located in the area.

The population, including St Margarets and Whitton, was 62,148 at the 2011 census.

Twickenham is the home of the Rugby Football Union, with hundreds of thousands of spectators visiting Twickenham Stadium each year. The historic riverside area has a network of 18th-century buildings and pleasure grounds, many of which have survived intact.

This area has three grand period mansions with public access: York House, Marble Hill and Strawberry Hill House.  Another has been lost, that belonging to 18th-century aphoristic poet Alexander Pope, who was known as the Bard of Twickenham. Strawberry Hill, the Neo-Gothic prototype home of Horace Walpole is linked with the oldest Roman Catholic university in the country, St Mary's University.

History

Pre-Norman
Excavations have revealed settlements in the area dating from the Early Neolithic, possibly Mesolithic, periods. Occupation seems to have continued through the Bronze Age, the Iron Age and the Roman occupation. The area was first mentioned (as "Tuican hom" and "Tuiccanham") in an 8th-century charter to cede the area to Waldhere, Bishop of London, "for the salvation of our souls". The charter, dated 13 June 704, is signed with 12 crosses. The signatories included Swaefred of Essex, Cenred of Mercia and Earl Paeogthath.

Norman
In Norman times Twickenham was part of the Manor of Isleworth – itself part of the Hundred of Hounslow, Middlesex (mentioned in Domesday Book of 1086). The manor had belonged to Ælfgār, Earl of Mercia in the time of Edward the Confessor, but was granted to Walter de Saint-Valery (Waleric) by William I of England after the Norman Conquest of England in 1066. The area was farmed, while the river provided opportunities for fishing, boatbuilding and trade.

17th century

Bubonic plague spread to the town in 1665 and 67 deaths were recorded. It appears that Twickenham had a pest house in the 17th century, although the location is not known.

There was also a watch house in the middle of the town, with stocks, a pillory and a whipping post whose owner was charged to "ward within and about this Parish and to keep all Beggars and Vagabonds that shall lye abide or lurk about the Towne and to give correction to such...".

In 1633 construction began on York House. It was occupied by Edward Montagu, 2nd Earl of Manchester in 1656 and later by Edward Hyde, 1st Earl of Clarendon.

1659 saw the first mention of the Twickenham Ferry, although ferrymen had already been operating in the area for many generations. Sometime before 1743 a "pirate" ferry appears to have been started by Twickenham inhabitants. There is speculation that it operated to serve "The Folly", a floating hostelry of some kind. Several residents wrote to the Lord Mayor of the City of London:

18th and 19th centuries
In 1713 the nave of the ancient St Mary's Church collapsed, and the church was rebuilt in the Neo-classical style to designs by a local architect, John James.

In 1736, the noted pharmacist and quack doctor Joshua Ward set up the Great Vitriol Works to produce sulphuric acid, using a process discovered in the seventeenth century by Johann Glauber in which sulphur is burned together with saltpetre (potassium nitrate), in the presence of steam. The process generates an extremely unpleasant smell, which caused objections from local residents. The area was also soon home to the world's first industrial production facility for gunpowder, on a site between Twickenham and Whitton on the banks of the River Crane. There were frequent explosions and loss of life. On 11 March 1758, one of two explosions was felt in Reading, Berkshire, and in April 1774 another explosion terrified people at church in Isleworth.

In 1772 three mills blew up, shattering glass and buildings in the neighbourhood. Horace Walpole, 4th Earl of Orford, wrote complaining to his friend and relative Henry Seymour Conway, then Lieutenant General of the Ordnance, that all the decorative painted glass had been blown out of his windows at Strawberry Hill.

The powder mills remained in operation until 1927 when they were closed. Much of the site is now occupied by Crane Park, in which the old Shot Tower, mill sluices and blast embankments can still be seen. Much of the area along the river next to the Shot Tower is now a nature reserve.

During the 18th and 19th centuries, a number of fine houses were built and Twickenham became a popular place of residence for people of "fashion and distinction". Further development was stimulated by the opening of Twickenham station in 1848.

In 1898 some buildings on London Road, near the east end of King Street, were demolished, and a new road was built, in order to relieve congestion on the older Church Street. This new road was named York Street and opened on 1 March 1899.

20th and 21st centuries

Electricity was introduced to Twickenham in 1902 and the first trams arrived the following year.

In 1939, when All Hallows Lombard Street was demolished in the City of London, its distinctive stone tower designed by Christopher Wren, with its peal of ten bells and connecting stone cloister, and the interior furnishings, including a Renatus Harris organ and a pulpit used by John Wesley, were brought to Twickenham to be incorporated in the new All Hallows Church on Chertsey Road (A316) near Twickenham Stadium.

The Twickenham Green area witnessed a high-profile murder on 19 August 2004, when French woman Amelie Delagrange (aged 22) died in hospital after being found with a serious head injury (caused by battery) in the area. Within 24 hours, police had established a link with the murder of Marsha McDonnell, who was killed in similar circumstances in nearby Hampton 18 months earlier. Levi Bellfield was found guilty of both murders on 25 February 2008 (as well as a further charge of attempted murder against 18-year-old Kate Sheedy) and sentenced to life imprisonment. In 2011 he was found guilty of the murder of Milly Dowler, a teenage girl who vanished from Walton-on-Thames in March 2002 and whose body was later found in Hampshire woodland.

Governance

From 1868 the area was administered jointly between the newly formed Middlesex County Council and the Twickenham Local Government District board, with the passing of the Local Government Act 1858.  Then in 1894 The Local Government Act 1894 reconstituted the area as Twickenham Urban District. In 1926 Twickenham was granted a charter of incorporation to become a municipal borough.  Eleven years later the urban district councils of Teddington, Hampton & Hampton Wick merged with Twickenham.

In 1965 Middlesex County Council was abolished and replaced with the Greater London Council  and the boroughs of Twickenham, Richmond and Barnes were combined to form the London Borough of Richmond upon Thames. In 1986 the Greater London Council was abolished and most powers devolved to local boroughs and others to the Government and joint boards. In 2000 the Greater London Authority was set up and two-tier administration returned, but with the top tier having a much more limited strategic role.

The borough council offices and chamber are located at York House, Twickenham and in the adjacent civic centre.

The Twickenham constituency in the UK Parliament includes the towns of Twickenham, St Margarets, Whitton, Teddington, Hampton, Fulwell, Hampton Hill and Hampton Wick. Since the 2019 UK General Election,  the Member of Parliament (MP) has been a Liberal Democrat, Munira Wilson.

Economy

As Twickenham is a London suburb, many local residents commute to central London or work locally in retail, hospitality, education or for one of the many professional firms based in the area. London Heathrow Airport is important to the local economy both through direct employment and the cluster of international firms that have their European headquarters in the Thames Valley area.  Unemployment in the area is very low, however there is a big difference in the salaries earned by residents who work inside the borough, compared to those whose employment is based outside.

The council has been making efforts to regenerate Twickenham town centre which has been struggling due to strong competition from Hounslow, Richmond and Kingston upon Thames.  It differs from most town centres as it has fewer retail shops, particularly chain stores, and more cafes, restaurants, banks and estate agents.  There has been a comprehensive scheme of town centre improvements including repaving in Yorkstone, a new arts centre, and improved gardens and riverside walk.  However, plans to build a barge house for Gloriana at Orleans Gardens and to move the youth centre out of Heatham House so the building could be converted into a hotel proved controversial and were dropped.

Population and housing

Data for 1891–1961 is available for the Urban Sanitary District, that was then the Metropolitan Borough which always included Whitton. The 2001 and 2011 Censuses give detailed information about the town/district. The settlement's population in 2011 were living in 22,273 households.

In terms of ethnicity (as of 2011 census), the majority of people in all four wards identified themselves as White British, ranging between 71% of the population in Twickenham Riverside to 78% in South Twickenham. The next largest ethnic groups in all four wards were Other White, White Irish and Indian.

Geography 
Twickenham is bounded by the River Thames on the south and the land is relatively flat though it does rise gently to the West as it approaches Whitton.  The land is fertile and was home to numerous market gardens before housing became the predominant land use with the coming on the railways in the mid nineteenth century.

The town is bordered on the south-eastern side by the River Thames and Eel Pie Island – which is connected to the Twickenham embankment by a narrow footbridge, the first of which was erected in 1957. Before this, access was by means of a hand-operated ferry that was hauled across using a chain on the riverbed. The land adjacent to the river, from Strawberry Hill in the south to Marble Hill Park in the north, is occupied by a mixture of luxury dwellings, formal gardens, public houses and a newly built park and leisure facility.

In the south, in Strawberry Hill, lies St Mary's University, Twickenham historically specialising in sports studies, teacher training, religious studies, the humanities, drama studies and English literature. Strawberry Hill was originally a small cottage in two or three acres (8,000 or 12,000 m2) of land by the River Thames. Horace Walpole, a son of the politician Robert Walpole, rented the cottage in 1747 and subsequently bought it and turned it into one of the incunabula of the Gothic revival. The university shares part of its campus with Walpole's Strawberry Hill. On adjacent land were the villa and garden of the poet Alexander Pope. The villa was demolished in 1808/09 following the orders of Lady Howe, who became irritated with the large number of tourists who visited the place. The grotto which formed the basement survived. A memorial plaque was placed on the site in remembrance in 1848.

A road just north of the campus is named Pope's Grove, and a local landmark next to the main road is the Alexander Pope Hotel (previously known as Pope's Grotto), a public house and hotel where Pope's landmark informal garden used to be. Near this hostelry lie St Catherine's school for girls and Radnor House School, in a building on the site of Pope's white stucco villa and the location of Pope's original – surviving – grotto.

There are a large number of fine houses in the area, many of them Victorian. The open space known as Radnor Gardens lies opposite Pope's Grotto.

Not far from Pope's Grotto is the Roman Catholic Church of Saint James, which has a memorial window in the form of the Royal Arms of Portugal and memorials to Manuel II, Portugal's last king, who worshipped here and died in nearby Fulwell Park in 1932.

Twickenham proper begins in the vicinity of Pope's Grotto, with generally large period houses to the west, the traditional definition of which is Twickenham Green, and similar housing in the east all the distance to Richmond Bridge typically largest near the Thames. The town centre is not actually in the centre of the town, rather in the south-eastern corner, as Twickenham was built up moving away from the Thames. Whitton lies further to the north and west.

The districts of East Twickenham and St Margarets lie to the north-east of central Twickenham on the west side of Richmond Bridge, the shortest bridge on the Tideway. These are popular for their attractive tree-lined residential roads and an eclectic range of shops and cafés. St Margarets is the location of Twickenham Studios, one of Greater London's major film studios.

East Twickenham abuts the River Thames at Richmond Bridge and St Margarets has its river frontage immediately to the north. The great estate of Cambridge Park, home of Richard Owen Cambridge, the 18th-century satirical poet, was located here.

Nearest places

 Fulwell
 Ham
 Hampton
 Hampton Hill
 Hampton Wick
 Hounslow
 Isleworth
 Kingston upon Thames
 Richmond
 St Margarets
 Teddington
 Whitton

Education

There are several schools in Twickenham including secondary schools, primary schools, universities and kindergartens. Many of these are easily accessible by the local bus network mentioned in the Transport section.

Richmond upon Thames College, a college of further and higher education, is on Egerton Road in Twickenham.

St Mary's University, Twickenham has been located in Twickenham since moving from Hammersmith in 1925

Transport

Until 1971 London Transport operated a bus depot known as Twickenham garage (coded AB) on Cambridge Road, East Twickenham. The relevant destination blind for garage journeys always referred to this location as Richmond Bridge, which was close by. On closure, all its routes and vehicles were transferred to Fulwell bus garage, but the building remained under the ownership of London Transport until the mid-1990s when it was demolished to make way for a housing development.

Fulwell garage was originally the base for London United Tramways in south Middlesex. The trams were replaced by trolleybuses that started operating from Fulwell garage in the 1930s.  The trolleybuses were later replaced by AEC Routemaster buses and Middlesex's last trolleybus terminated here on the night of 8 May 1962, following a commemorative circuit of the Fulwell routes by Middlesex's first trolleybus, No.1 of the A1 class Felthams, known as "Diddlers". This vehicle is preserved in working order.

Originally Twickenham railway station was situated on the western side of the A310 London Road bridge before the new station was opened on the eastern side. This accounts for roads named Railway Approach and Station Road, which now give no access to the station.

Nearest railway stations
The main railway station in the town is Twickenham itself, although St Margarets, Whitton, Fulwell and Strawberry Hill stations are also within the Twickenham post town. Stations in nearby towns (all, except for Richmond and Isleworth, once part of the former Borough of Twickenham) are:

Hampton railway station
Hampton Wick railway station
Isleworth railway station
Richmond station
Teddington railway station

Buses

London Buses serving Twickenham are:

All above routes serve King Street in the town centre apart from the 110 and the 481. The 481 runs through western Twickenham and the 110 runs through northern Twickenham. The N22 and the N33 only operate at night (00:00–05:00).

Sport

Twickenham is home to the headquarters of the Rugby Football Union and Twickenham Stadium. The England national rugby union team play all their home matches at Twickenham Stadium, which is one of England's largest stadiums and the world's largest rugby stadium. Harlequins, a rugby union club, play at the Twickenham Stoop.

Twickenham Stadium hosted Rugby World Cup fixtures in 1991, 1999 and 2015, including semi-final matches in 1999 and the final matches in 1991 and 2015.

Arts and culture
The Exchange is a community building, including a 320-seat theatre, opposite Twickenham railway station. It opened in October 2017. The building is owned by Richmond upon Thames Council and is managed by St Mary's University, Twickenham.

The Twickenham Museum is a volunteer-run museum opposite St Mary's parish church. It is open every day except Mondays.

The Cabbage Patch pub on London Road has, since 1983, been a regular venue for live music on Sunday nights, organised by TwickFolk.

Public art

In 2015, working in partnership with Richmond upon Thames Council and the architectural design practice Feilden Clegg Bradley Studios, Twickenham resident Graham Henderson conceived, designed, built and installed Pope's Urn, an important contemporary piece of public art, inspired by the poetry of Alexander Pope. Enjoying a central position on the Twickenham riverside, the sculpture was commissioned to celebrate the 2015 Rugby World Cup, and was opened in a ceremony in September 2015.

Places of worship

People

Living people
Steve Allen, radio presenter, lives in Twickenham.
Tony Blair, former UK Prime Minister, lived in a house in Twickenham in 1972, which he rented from a member of the Vineyard Church in Richmond, and used the Vineyard's crypt every Sunday for promotional events.
Jason Bradbury, children's writer and TV presenter, lives in Twickenham.
Rob Brydon, comedian, lives in Strawberry Hill.
Michael Fish, television and radio weather forecaster, lives in Twickenham.
Oliver Golding, former child actor and current LTA junior tennis player, has lived in Twickenham.
Keeley Hawes, actress, and Matthew Macfadyen, actor, live in Twickenham.
Graham Henderson, arts consultant and Chief Executive of the Rimbaud and Verlaine Foundation, lives in Twickenham.
Roxanna Panufnik, composer and musician, was brought up in the Panufnik family home at Riverside House in Twickenham overlooking the Thames.
Tim Rowett, renowned toy collector and YouTube personality, lives in Twickenham.
Pete Townshend, guitarist for The Who, who lives at The Wick on Richmond Hill, previously lived at Chapel House, Twickenham, now called 15 Montpelier Row.

Historical figures

 Brothers Arthur Anderson (1886–1967) and Gerard Anderson (1889–1914) were born in Twickenham and competed in track and field events in the 1912 Summer Olympics. Gerard was also the world record holder in the 440 metres hurdles. Gerard served as a second lieutenant in the Cheshire Regiment in the First World War. He was mentioned in despatches and was killed in combat in 1914.
Trevor Baylis (1937–2018), inventor of the clockwork radio, lived, worked and died on Eel Pie Island, Twickenham.
Richard Owen Cambridge (1717–1802), poet, lived at Cambridge House, Twickenham.
Kitty Clive (1711–1785), actress, who retired in 1769 to a villa in Twickenham that had been a gift from her friend Horace Walpole, dying there in 1785. She was buried at St Mary's. At the northeast corner of the church, there is a memorial to her on which a poem praises her generosity.
Walter de la Mare (1873–1956), poet, lived at South End House in Montpelier Row from 1940 until his death.
Henry Du Pre Labouchere (1831–1912), Liberal MP and journalist, lived at Pope's Villa, Cross Deep, Twickenham. The site is marked by a blue plaque.
Katie Edith Gliddon (1883–1967), watercolour artist and militant suffragette, was born in Twickenham.
Ron Greenwood (1921–2006), manager of West Ham United F.C. and the England national football team, lived in Twickenham early in his career.
Harry Hampton  (1870–1922) was born in Crown Terrace, Richmond and died in Twickenham. He is buried in Richmond Old Cemetery.
The Hon. Nellie Ionides (1883–1962) lived at Riverside House, Twickenham. A collector, connoisseur and philanthropist, she is best known for saving the 18th-century Octagon Room at Orleans House in Twickenham from destruction, and for donating this and also many pieces from her extensive art collection to the local council (now the London Borough of Richmond upon Thames). 
Norman Cyril Jackson  (1919–1994) died in Hampton Hill and is buried in Twickenham Cemetery.
Harriet Kendall (1857–1933),  elocutionist, singer, pianist, poet and composer of ballads, lived at Elsinore, 8 Park Road, East Twickenham.
Sir Godfrey Kneller (1646–1723), portrait painter, who lived in Whitton, was a churchwarden at St Mary's, Twickenham when its 14th-century nave collapsed in 1713 and he was active in the plans for the church's reconstruction by John James. Kneller's remains were interred in the church.
Batty Langley (1696–1751), garden designer, was the son of a jobbing gardener in Twickenham and was baptised there.
Charles Lightoller (1874–1952), the most senior officer to survive the Titanic sinking; in retirement from 1947 until his death in 1952, he lived at and managed Richmond Slipways in East Twickenham (No. 1, Duck's Walk), which built and maintained motor launches for the river police.
The future Louis Philippe I, Duc d’Orleans, who was King of the French from 1830 to 1848, went into exile in 1793 and, before his return to France in 1815 on the fall of Napoleon, lived mostly in Twickenham. He and his two younger brothers lived in relative poverty from 1800 to 1807 at Highshot House, Crown Road; the house was demolished in 1927. From 1815 to 1817 Louis Philippe leased a house on the Twickenham riverside and gave it the name Orleans House. The house was demolished in 1926 but the octagon and some outbuildings survived and are now the Orleans House Gallery. After the 1848 revolution, many members of Louis Philippe's large family were forced into exile and took residences in the Richmond area.
 King Manuel II of Portugal (1874–1952)  lived in exile at Fulwell Park, Twickenham, following the 5 October 1910 revolution in Portugal.  He died in the house in 1932.
Andrzej Panufnik (1914–1991), Polish-born composer, lived and died in a house on Twickenham Riverside.
Alexander Pope (1688–1744), poet, lived in Twickenham. Pope was known as the Bard of Twickenham, or sometimes, on account of his acerbity, the Wasp of Twickenham. He lies in St Mary's, Twickenham under a stone slab engraved simply with the letter P, near a bronze memorial plate.
Peter Sallis (1921–2017), actor, was born in Twickenham. He was the voice of Wallace in the Wallace and Gromit films.
 James Saunders (1925–2004), playwright, lived in East Twickenham.
 Sir Ratan Tata (1871–1918), a Parsee and a major industrialist in India, who bought York House, Twickenham in 1906 and lived there until 1914, when he returned to India. His widow Navajbai decided to sell the house and its contents in 1924.
Alfred, Lord Tennyson (1809–1892), author and poet, lived at Chapel House, now 15 Montpelier Row from 1851 until 1853. His son Hallam Tennyson (1852–1928), second Governor-General of Australia, was born there. and was christened at St Mary's, Twickenham in 1852.
J M W Turner (1775–1851), artist, designed and commissioned the building of Solus Lodge in Sandycoombe Road, on the border of East Twickenham and St Margarets. The house survives as Sandycombe Lodge. The site is marked by a blue plaque.
Thomas Twining (1675–1741) was a merchant, and the founder of the tea company Twinings. In about 1722 he bought a property later known as Dial House, next door to the church of St Mary's, Twickenham, where he either rebuilt, or converted and extended, the buildings already there. The sundial on the façade carries the date 1726, possibly the time when the new building was finished. After Twining died in 1741, he was buried at St Mary's, where there is a memorial to him at the north-east corner of the church.
Horace Walpole (1717–1797), art historian, man of letters, antiquarian and politician, built and lived at Strawberry Hill House in Twickenham.
 Paul Whitehead (1710–1774), poet and satirist, secretary to the infamous Hellfire Club, who lived at Colne Lodge, Twickenham from about 1755.

See also
Twickenham Cemetery
Twickenham Golf Course
Twickenham Ferry
Twickenham Museum

Notes

References

Further reading

External links

 Borough of Twickenham Local History Society
 London Borough of Richmond upon Thames Council
 The Twickenham Museum
 The Twickenham Society
 Twickenham Town Business Association
 Twickerati local news, events & discussion blog

 
Areas of London
District centres of London
Districts of London on the River Thames
Districts of the London Borough of Richmond upon Thames
London Borough of Richmond upon Thames
Places formerly in Middlesex